Philipp Eggersglüß (born 28 April 1995) is a German footballer who plays as a right-back for Atlas Delmenhorst.

Club career
Eggersglüß joined Werder Bremen in 2012 from FC Verden 04. On 1 November 2015, he scored on his professional debut in Werder Bremen II's 3–2 defeat of Chemnitzer FC. In May 2018, following Werder Bremen II's relegation from the 3. Liga, it was announced Eggersglüß would be one of ten players to leave the club.

In June 2018, Eggersglüß joined Regionalliga West side Rot-Weiß Oberhausen.

Career statistics

References

Living people
1995 births
German footballers
Association football midfielders
3. Liga players
Regionalliga players
SV Werder Bremen II players
Rot-Weiß Oberhausen players
Atlas Delmenhorst players